The Turkestan ground jay, grey ground jay or Pander's ground-jay (Podoces panderi) is a species of bird in the crow and jay family, Corvidae. It is found in central Asia, particularly Kazakhstan, Turkmenistan, and Uzbekistan. More specifically, they tend to be found in Astragalus, Calligonum and southern Salsola vegetation zones. It is closely related to the Iranian ground jay. Its natural habitat is sandy desert with low shrub cover. It also forages around human settlements and roads.

References

Turkestan ground jay
Birds of Central Asia
Turkestan ground jay
Taxonomy articles created by Polbot